Mintita Wattanakul (born February 22, 1988, in Thailand), nickname Mint, is a Thai singer and actress under Broadcast Thai Television Company Limited. Known for Formosa Betrayed (2009), My Valentine (2010), The Cupids Series (2017) and My Secret Bride (2019).

Biography

Personal life
In education, Attend kindergarten at Chatchalerm Kindergarten, Primary education at Daru nothayan School (General department), Secondary education at Bodindecha (Sing Singhaseni) School (B.D.34) and graduated from Chulalongkorn University with a bachelor's degree in Faculty of Economics in 2011.

Career
 2006–2011
In 2006, Mintita applied to compete in the singing contest of the reality TV show, True Academy Fantasia Season 3 (which at that time was still UBC Academy Fantasia), with the identification code as V5 and received the 3rd runner up award. And after finishing the competition from True Academy Fantasia Season 3, Mintita has been an artist under True Fantasia for 5 years. In 2007, Mintita became a member of 7 สาวสะบัดโชว์ (7 Sao Sabud Show), and released a Luk Thung 7 Sao Sabud Show album.

 2012–present
After the expiration of the 5-year contract with True Fantasia, Mintita did not renew the contract. And is currently an actress under Broadcast Thai Television Company Limited.

Filmography

TV dramas

Movies

Sitcoms

Series

Musical theatres

Television show

Discography

 2006
 AF3 School Bus Album: Game Khong Tur (Your game)
 2007
 AF The Musical, Ngern Ngern Ngern (Money Money Money) Album: Kae Kueb
 Luk Thung 7 Sao Sabud Show Album - 7 Sao Sabud Show (girl group)
 2008
 Ost. Pah Loke Bunterng: Kao Kaeng Khor Khai
 Kunpra Talerng Sok Album: Troos Jeen (Ft. Boy Pisanu)
 2009
 The legend of Reh Khai Fun Chaliang the musical Album: Yang Mee
 Loy Tian (Ft. Off Chainon), Ost. Nong Mai Rai Borisut
  (girl group, since 2009–2010)
 Girlz to Go Album: Kon Kee Ngao Kub Sao Karng Baan (Girlz next door), Tur Mee Arai Kub Khao Rue Pao, Krai Kor Mai Ruk, Khob Kun Tee Rub Fung
 2011
 Project. Music Recipe: Chah Pai Mai Tur
 Kae Puen (Just friend), Ost. Nong Mai Rai Borisut
 2012
 Ost. Tom Yum Lum Sing: Ji Hoy Koy Ruk, Ya Mong Tae Ta 
 Hua Jai Lom Look (Ft. Ron Patarapon), Ost. Nong Mai Rai Borisut
 Ost. Ma née Dan Suang: Te wada Jao Kha
 Ost. Raeng Ngao: Ngao Tee Mee Hua Jai (A shadow with a heart)
 2013
 Ost. Muchjurarch Si Numpueng: Nee Hua Jai
 Nid Nueng Ost. Croissant Tumnong Tuk
 Kum Wah Puen (Ft. Game Tichakorn), Ost. Nong Mai Rai Borisut
 Ost. Madam Dun: Laew Chun Ja Luerk Krai (Ft. Nui Nuntakarn)
 2014
 Kon Mai Dee ⟨Japanese Ver.⟩, Ost. The Rising Sun: Roy Fun Tawan Duerd
 Ost. Suer Singh Krating Bong: Ab Ruk Ab Ror
 Ost. Lookmai Lai Ruk: Reark Wah Ruk Rue Pao (Ft. Boy Pisanu)
 2016
 Ost. Kum Lai Mas: Ja Ruk Jon Wun Soot Tai
 2017
 Altogether - Crossthy Feat. Mint Tita
 2021
 Fah Lang Fon - (Ft. Typhoon Kanokchat & Jaja Primrata)
 2022
 Ost. Leh Luntaya: Chure Cha Piang Dai
 Píi Gub Nong... Rong Pleng Kamphee Album: Ma Tarm Sanya

Awards and nominations

References

External links
 
 
 
 

Living people
Mintita Wattanakul
Mintita Wattanakul
Mintita Wattanakul
Mintita Wattanakul
Mintita Wattanakul
Mintita Wattanakul
Mintita Wattanakul
Mintita Wattanakul
Mintita Wattanakul
1988 births